Gudu Gudu Gunjam  is 2010 Telugu-language comedy film, produced by V. Ravi Kumar Reddy on Sri Chitra banner and directed by Veeru K. Starring Rajendra Prasad, Sithara, Kasturi, Parthu, Chahat, Arthi Puri  and music also composed by Veeru K. The film was recorded as a flop at the box office.

Plot
Gopalam is a famous criminal lawyer but he is a henpecked husband, his wife Seeta on the other hand is blindly doting on their son Parthu and the youngster is rather reckless. The story takes a turn when Parthu kisses a girl in the college. The girl's mother is enraged and she vows revenge. Parthu escapes to Bangkok and there, he falls in love with another girl Meenakshi. Gopalam and Sita say yes to the marriage and everything is set. Here she meets Meenakshi's aunt Malliswari, who puts one condition to approving of Parthu and Meenakshi's marriage that Seeta should allow Malliswari to marry her husband Gopalam.

Cast

Rajendra Prasad as Gopalam
Sithara as Seeta
Kasturi as Malliswari
Parthu as Parthu
Chahat as Meenakshi
Arthi Puri 
Rithima 
Fhara
Suman as Venkataratnam
Brahmanandam
M. S. Narayana as Rama Swamy
Venu Madhav
Kondavalasa 
Krishna Bhagavaan
Gundu Sudarshan
Jenny
Telangana Shakuntala
Surekha Vani
Kinnera

Soundtrack

Music composed by Veeru K. Music was released on Shivaranjani Music Company.

References

External links

2010s Telugu-language films
2010 films
Indian comedy-drama films
2010 comedy-drama films